Prospalaea is a genus of parasitic flies in the family Tachinidae.

Species
Prospalaea insularis (Brauer & von Bergenstamm, 1891)

Distribution
Puerto Rico, Virgin Islands.

References

Monotypic Brachycera genera
Diptera of North America
Exoristinae
Tachinidae genera
Taxa named by John Merton Aldrich